Corethrogyne filaginifolia (syn. Lessingia filaginifolia) is a species of flowering plant in the daisy family known by the common names common sandaster and California aster.

The taxonomy of this plant and certain relatives is currently changing; recently the Corethrogynes have been grouped together under the name Lessingia filaginifolia, and then moved back to genus Corethrogyne as a single species with many synonyms.

It is native to western North America from the southwestern corner of Oregon through California to Baja California, where it is a common member of many plant communities, including chaparral and woodlands, forests, scrub, grasslands, and the serpentine soils flora.

Description
Corethrogyne filaginifolia is a robust perennial herb or subshrub producing a simple to multibranched stem approaching  in maximum length or height. The densely woolly leaves are several centimeters long and toothed or lobed low on the stem and smaller farther up the stem.

The inflorescence is a single flower head or array of several heads at the tips of stem branches. The head is lined with narrow, pointed, purple-tipped phyllaries which curl back as the head matures. Inside are many purple, lavender, pink, or white ray florets and a center packed with up to 120 tubular yellow disc florets.

The fruit is an achene with a pappus of reddish bristles on top.

References

External links

Corethrogyne filaginifolia at Calflora
 Corethrogyne filaginifolia at Jepson eFlora
United States Department of Agriculture Plants Profile for Corethrogyne filaginifolia (common sandaster)
Corethrogyne filaginifolia — Calphotos Photo gallery, University of California

Astereae
Flora of Baja California
Flora of California
Flora of Oregon
Natural history of the California chaparral and woodlands
Plants described in 1833
Taxa named by William Jackson Hooker
Taxa named by Thomas Nuttall
Flora without expected TNC conservation status